English singer S-X has released five studio albums, two extended plays (EPs), 28 singles, and 15 music videos.

Albums

Studio Albums

Mixtapes

Extended plays

Singles

As lead artist

As featured artist

Guest appearances

Music videos

References

Discographies of British artists